Cavernularia obesa is a species of marine cnidarians in the family Veretillidae.

Cavernularia obesa is widespread throughout the tropical waters of the Indo-Pacific area. It is a bioluminescent organism whose light-emitter is composed of 2-(p-hydroxyphenylacetamido)-3-benzyl-5-(p-hydroxyphenyl)pyrazine.

References

External links
 marinespecies
 eol
 recif-france.com

Veretillidae
Animals described in 1850